Styrax platanifolius is a species of flowering plant in the family Styracaceae known by the common name sycamoreleaf snowbell. It is native to northeastern Mexico in the states of Coahuila, Nuevo León, and Tamaulipas and the US state of Texas, especially on the Edwards Plateau.

Description
This is a shrub which can grow to 6 meters. The leaves are variable in shape, generally oval with smooth, toothed, or lobed edges, and measuring 4.5 to 12 centimeters in length. The inflorescence is a solitary flower or cluster of up to 7. The bell-shaped white flower is 1 or 2 centimeters long. The fruit is a hairy, spherical capsule about a centimeter long.

Taxonomy
There are five subspecies of this plant. Some were formerly considered species, but genetic analysis suggests they are more closely related and should be treated as subtaxa of one species. The subspecies are mostly characterized on the basis of the amount and arrangement of hairs on the leaves and other parts.

Subspecies

S. p. ssp. mollis - known from the Sierra Madre Oriental in Nuevo León and Tamaulipas in Mexico.
S. p. ssp. platanifolius - once the most widespread subspecies and now quite rare.
S. p. ssp. stellatus (hairy sycamoreleaf snowbell) - formerly S. stellatus, a rare subspecies found along the southern edge of the Edwards Plateau
S. p. ssp. texanus (Texas snowbell) - formerly S. texana or S. texanus, rare and federally listed as an endangered species of the United States. There are about 22 populations remaining in the state of Texas.
S. p. ssp. youngiae (Young's snowbell) - formerly S. youngiae, occurs in Coahuila and possibly in the Davis Mountains of Texas.

References

platanifolius
Flora of Coahuila
Flora of Nuevo León
Flora of Tamaulipas
Flora of Texas
Flora of Mexico